Tuggerah is a developing suburb of the Central Coast region of New South Wales, Australia, situated on the Main North Line railway and Sydney-Newcastle Freeway approximately 90 km north of Sydney. It is a mixture of semi-rural, Residential, and light industrial. Historically it was, like much of the Wyong District a dairy area, which currently still has the Pioneer Dairy Wetlands. There was an airstrip for some years which has now been built over. The Wyong South sewerage plant is also located in Tuggerah.

History

Etymology
Not to be confused with Togara, Queensland (near Emerald), Tuggerah was originally an Aboriginal word but its true meaning is not agreed upon by all sources. Some say that it originally meant 'cold' or 'cold place', and some say its original meaning was 'savannah grasslands'. Tuggerah was the name for the region, with The Entrance originally called "Tuggerah Entrance". "Tuggerah Beach" is located between North Entrance and Noraville. There was previously an electorate in the NSW Parliament called Tuggerah.

Commercial area 
Tuggerah is a major light industrial and commercial area for the northern Central Coast. It is a huge attraction for the Central Coast and further out residents for its Shopping Centre Westfield Tuggerah as well as the Tuggerah Supa Centre in Bryant Drive and numerous other shops along Pacific Highway. A number of well known business have Headquarters and offices in the Tuggerah Business Park such as Belkin, ING Australia, as well as the Zenith Business Centre on Reliance Drive.

References 

Suburbs of the Central Coast (New South Wales)